The Roman Catholic Diocese of Odienné is a diocese located in the city of Odienné in the Ecclesiastical province of Korhogo in Côte d'Ivoire.

History
 December 19, 1994: Established as Diocese of Odienné from the Diocese of Daloa, Diocese of Korhogo and Diocese of Man

Special churches
The Cathedral is the Cathédrale Saint-Augustin in Odienné.

Leadership
 Bishops of Odienné (Roman rite)
 Bishop Maurice Konan Kouassi (1994.12.19 – 2005.03.22), appointed Bishop of Daloa
 Bishop Salomon Lezoutié (2005.07.29 - 2009.01.03), appointed Coadjutor Bishop of Yopougon
 Bishop Antoine Koné (2009.07.01 - 2019.05.08)

See also
Roman Catholicism in Côte d'Ivoire
List of Roman Catholic dioceses in Côte d'Ivoire

Sources
 GCatholic.org
 Catholic Hierarchy

Roman Catholic dioceses in Ivory Coast
Christian organizations established in 1994
Roman Catholic dioceses and prelatures established in the 20th century
Denguélé District
Odienné
1994 establishments in Ivory Coast
Roman Catholic Ecclesiastical Province of Korhogo